Stempfferia mara is a butterfly in the family Lycaenidae. It is found in Uganda (the western shore of Lake Victoria) and north-western Tanzania.

References

Butterflies described in 1935
Poritiinae
Insects of Uganda
Insects of Tanzania